Almeida may refer to:

People
 Almeida (surname)
 Almeida Garrett (1799–1854), Portuguese poet, playwright, novelist and politician

Places
 Almeida, Boyacá, a town and municipality in Colombia
 Almeida Municipality, Portugal
 Almeida, Portugal, a town in Almeida Municipality
 17040 Almeida, an asteroid

In warfare
 Siege of Almeida (1762), during the Seven Years' War
 Siege of Almeida (1810), during the Napoleonic Wars in Portugal
 Blockade of Almeida (1811), during the Napoleonic Wars in Portugal

Other uses
 Almeida Theatre, a theatre in the UK
 Almeida Recebida, a bible version

See also
 Almeidas Province, Colombia
 Almeidaea (fungi) , genus of fungi in Chaetothyriaceae family